The Northwestern Wildcats field hockey team is the intercollegiate field hockey program representing Northwestern University. The school competes in the Big Ten Conference in Division I of the National Collegiate Athletic Association (NCAA). The Northwestern field hockey team plays its home games at Lakeside Field on the university campus in Evanston, Illinois. The Wildcats have won six regular-season conference titles, one conference tournament championship, and have appeared in the NCAA tournament 17 times, advancing to the Final Four on four occasions. In 2021, the Wildcats won their first NCAA tournament. The team is currently coached by Tracey Fuchs.

History 

Field hockey has been a varsity sport at Northwestern University since 1980, although the school has fielded intercollegiate teams since 1975. From 1981 to 1988 and again since 1992, the Wildcats have played in the Big Ten Conference. Between 1989 and 1991, Northwestern was a member of the Midwestern Collegiate Field Hockey Conference (MCFHC). The university also considers its 1977 and 1978 teams to have competed in the Big Ten, although field hockey was not a varsity sport at Northwestern for either of these seasons. As a Big Ten member, the Wildcats have won six regular-season conference titles as well as one conference tournament championship. Four of these Big Ten regular-season titles were won under the guidance of head coach Nancy Stevens, who lead the team from 1981 to 1989. Northwestern qualified for the NCAA tournament every year between 1983 and 1994 except for 1992, and it has reached the Final Four on four occasions. The Wildcats are currently coached by Tracey Fuchs. Prior to her tenure, Northwestern has been coached by Mary Ann Kelling (1975), Mary DiStanislao (1976–78), Sharon Drysdale (1979–80), Stevens (1981–89), Marisa Didio (1990–94 and 2000–03), Debra Brickey (1995–97), Diane Loosbrock (1998–99), and Kelly McCollum (2004–08).

Season-by-season results 

Season-by-season results through the end of the 2022 season

Awards and accolades

Conference championships
Northwestern has won six conference titles, all in the Big Ten Conference. Four of their championships were won during the tenure of head coach Nancy Stevens in the 1980s.

Honda-Broderick Cup winners

All-Americans

Olympians

Awards and accolades through the end of the 2014 season

Stadium 
Northwestern has played its home games at Lakeside Field since its construction in 1997. Located on the shore of Lake Michigan, the field is part of the university's $3.5-million Leonard B. Thomas Athletic Complex on the north end of its main campus in Evanston. Lakeside Field features an AstroTurf playing field that was installed in 2015 and a seating capacity of 300, as well as a permanent scoreboard, a sound system, and lighting that allows for the playing of night games. The venue has hosted the Big Ten Field Hockey Tournament three times, in 2002, 2004, 2018. Lakeside Field is located adjacent to Lenny and Sharon Martin Stadium, previously also known as Lakeside Field, which is home to Northwestern's women's lacrosse, men's soccer, and women's soccer teams.

See also
List of NCAA Division I field hockey programs

References

External links